Cazaubon (Gascon: Casaubon) is a commune in the Gers department of southwestern France.

Besides the town of Cazaubon itself, the commune includes the adjacent spa town of Barbotan-les-Thermes.

Geography

Population

See also
Communes of the Gers department

References

Communes of Gers